The men's long jump competition at the 1998 Asian Games in Bangkok, Thailand was held on 14 and 15 December at the Thammasat Stadium.

Schedule
All times are Indochina Time (UTC+07:00)

Results
Legend
NM — No mark

Qualification
 Qualification: Qualifying performance 7.60 (Q) or at least 12 best performers (q) advance to the final.

Final

References

External links
Results

Men's long jump
1998